A Love Sublime (also known as Orpheus) is a 1917 American drama film directed by Tod Browning.

Cast
 Wilfred Lucas - Philip
 Carmel Myers - Toinette
 F. A. Turner - The Professor (as Fred A. Turner)
 Alice Wilson - The Sculptress (as Alice Rae)
 George Beranger - Her Husband
 Jack Brammall - Piney the Rat
 James O'Shea - Policeman
 Bert Woodruff - The Little Red Doctor
 Mildred Harris - Eurydice

References

External links

1917 films
1917 drama films
American silent feature films
American black-and-white films
Films directed by Tod Browning
Films directed by Wilfred Lucas
Silent American drama films
1910s American films